In mathematics, a Lambert series, named for Johann Heinrich Lambert, is a series taking the form

It can be resumed formally by expanding the denominator:

where the coefficients of the new series are given by the Dirichlet convolution of an with the constant function 1(n) = 1:

This series may be inverted by means of the Möbius inversion formula, and is an example of a Möbius transform.

Examples
Since this last sum is a typical number-theoretic sum, almost any natural multiplicative function will be exactly summable when used in a Lambert series.  Thus, for example, one has

where  is the number of positive divisors of the number n.

For the higher order sum-of-divisor functions, one has

where  is any complex number and

is the divisor function.

which is (up to the factor of ) the logarithmic derivative of the usual generating function for partition numbers

Additional Lambert series related to the previous identity include those for the variants of the 
Möbius function given below  

Related Lambert series over the Moebius function include the following identities for any 
prime :

The proof of the first identity above follows from a multi-section (or bisection) identity of these 
Lambert series generating functions in the following form where we denote 
 to be the Lambert series generating function of the arithmetic function f: 
 
The second identity in the previous equations follows from the fact that the coefficients of the left-hand-side sum are given by 
 
where the function  is the multiplicative identity with respect to the operation of Dirichlet convolution of arithmetic functions.

For Euler's totient function :

For Von Mangoldt function :

For Liouville's function :

with the sum on the right similar to the Ramanujan theta function, or Jacobi theta function . Note that Lambert series in which the an are trigonometric functions, for example, an = sin(2n x), can be evaluated by various combinations of the logarithmic derivatives of Jacobi theta functions.

Generally speaking, we can extend the previous generating function expansion by letting  denote the characteristic function of the  powers, for positive natural numbers  and defining the generalized m-Liouville lambda function to be the arithmetic function satisfying . This definition of  clearly implies that , which in turn shows that

We also have a slightly more generalized Lambert series expansion generating the sum of squares function  in the form of 

The conventional use of the letter q in the summations is a historical usage, referring to its origins in the theory of elliptic curves and theta functions, as the nome.

Alternate form
Substituting  one obtains another common form for the series, as

where

as before.

Current usage

In the literature we find Lambert series applied to a wide variety of sums.  For example, since  is a polylogarithm function, we may refer to any sum of the form

as a Lambert series, assuming that the parameters are suitably restricted.  Thus

which holds for all complex q not on the unit circle, would be considered a Lambert series identity.  This identity follows in a straightforward fashion from some identities published by the Indian mathematician S. Ramanujan.  A very thorough exploration of Ramanujan's works can be found in the works by Bruce Berndt.

Factorization theorems

A somewhat newer construction recently published over 2017–2018 relates to so-termed Lambert series factorization theorems of the form

where  is the respective sum or difference of the 
restricted partition functions  which denote the number of 's in all partitions of  into an even (respectively, odd) number of distinct parts. Let  denote the invertible lower triangular sequence whose first few values are shown in the table below.

Another characteristic form of the Lambert series factorization theorem expansions is given by

where  is the (infinite) q-Pochhammer symbol. The invertible matrix products on the right-hand-side of the previous equation correspond to inverse matrix products whose lower triangular entries are given in terms of the partition function and the Möbius function by the divisor sums

The next table lists the first several rows of these corresponding inverse matrices.

We let  denote the sequence of interleaved pentagonal numbers, i.e., so that the pentagonal number theorem is expanded in the form of

This work on Lambert series factorization theorems is extended in to more general expansions of the form

where  is any (partition-related) reciprocal generating function,  is any arithmetic function, and where the 
modified coefficients are expanded by

The corresponding inverse matrices in the above expansion satisfy

so that as in the first variant of the Lambert factorization theorem above we obtain an inversion relation for the right-hand-side coefficients of the form

Recurrence relations

Within this section we define the following functions for natural numbers : 
 

We also adopt the notation from the previous section that

where  is the infinite q-Pochhammer symbol. Then we have the following recurrence relations for involving these functions and the pentagonal numbers proved in:

Derivatives

We have the following identities for the termwise  derivatives of a Lambert series for any 

where the bracketed triangular coefficients in the previous equations denote the Stirling numbers of the first and second kinds. 
We also have the next identity for extracting the individual coefficients of the terms implicit to the previous expansions given in the form of

Now if we define the functions  for any  by

where  denotes Iverson's convention, then we have the coefficients for the  derivatives of a Lambert series 
given by

Of course, by a typical argument purely by operations on formal power series we also have that

See also
 Erdős–Borwein constant
 Arithmetic function
 Dirichlet convolution

References

 
 
 
 
 
 

Analytic number theory
Q-analogs
Mathematical series